The Revenge of Shinobi, released in Japan as  is a hack-and-slash action video game developed and published by Sega in 1989. It was the first Shinobi game developed for the Sega Genesis, and was later released on the coin-operated version of that console, the Mega-Tech.

Alongside Shadow Dancer, the game is a sequel to Shinobi, and features an original score by Yuzo Koshiro. The game was included in the compilations: Mega Games 2, Mega Drive 6 Pak, Sega Classics Arcade Collection (for the Sega CD), and Sega Smash Pack (for the PC and Dreamcast). It was also re-released for the Wii Virtual Console in 2009, on the PlayStation 3 via PlayStation Network and Xbox 360 via Xbox Live Arcade download services in 2012, and for iOS and Android devices in 2017 via Sega Forever.The game also appears on the Sega Genesis Classics (released as Sega Mega Drive Classics in PAL regions) for Windows, Linux, macOS, PlayStation 4, Xbox One and Nintendo Switch.

Plot 
Taking place three years after the first game, the criminal organization Zeed from the original game has since reformed and have renamed themselves "Neo Zeed". They decide to have their revenge on the Oboro Ninja clan and Joe Musashi by killing his master and kidnapping Joe's bride, Naoko. Joe, having reached the clan too late, manages to learn about Neo Zeed's plot by his dying master. Joe decides to travel the world to gain his revenge on Neo Zeed as well as try to save Naoko before it is too late.

Gameplay 
The game is a traditional side-scrolling platform game. The player controls Joe Musashi and must complete eight districts before the final confrontation with the head of Neo Zeed. Each district consists of three scenes, two of which are platforming levels and the third being a battle against a unique boss character.

The directional pad moves Joe around while the A, B, and C buttons are used to perform ninjutsu techniques, attack and jump, respectively. A key move in The Revenge of Shinobi is the somersault, which maximizes Joe's jumping height and enables him to throw eight shuriken at once in mid-air. Additionally, some stages consist of multiple layers, such as the first scene of the Military Base and the freeway in Area Code 818. Switching between layers is also done with the somersault move.

Alongside his standard moves and attacks, Joe has the ability to do four special ninjutsu techniques. Only one can be performed per life, unless a ninjutsu item was picked up, or the ninjutsu of Mijin was used.

A variety of bonus crates can be found in each level, some hidden in the scenery. These include simple powerups such as extra shuriken or health packs, as well as special items to gain lives or extra ninjutsu attacks. Besides powerups, some crates may contain time bombs: explosives that detonate when their fuse runs out or if Joe comes too close (though he can walk out of the blast radius if the player is quick enough).

The game is divided into four difficulties. As difficulty increases, more enemies appear per stage; on Hardest, Joe takes twice as much damage and the number of starting lives decreases from 10 to 1. From the options menu, the player can also choose the number of starting shuriken from 0 to 90 (though a technique does exist that allows infinite shuriken). The game has two different endings, depending on whether Joe rescues his bride or not.

Development 
The game's director Noriyoshi Ohba intended Revenge of Shinobi to be a showcase for the then-new Genesis hardware as well as to adapt the series to something better suited for a home console. As a result, the game is more story-driven with Joe Musashi not rescuing multiple hostages in each level as in the original game, but a single hostage at the end. A life bar was introduced as being more appropriate for a console game of that scope. Ohba intended Revenge of Shinobi to have a high level of difficulty to get the player to think about how they could best beat the game. The game's ninja magic was intended to be helpful in particular situations or boss encounters, making certain parts of the game much easier if the player knew which ninja magic to use at what time.

Some of the game's enemies are notably too similar to various characters from film and comic books, a fact that Ohba attributes to his own lack of creativity. He made rough sketches of these characters based on what he had in mind at the time, expecting that the character designer would modify them and add their own creative touches for the final game. However, they did not, resulting in some enemy characters who were similar to the likes of Sylvester Stallone, Batman, Spider-Man, Terminator and Godzilla.

Release
Because of copyright issues regarding certain enemy characters (many of which were based on cultural icons) there were at least four versions of the game in Japan and North America, with the later two also appearing in Europe:
 Software revision 1.00 (1989): Enemy characters resembling Rambo called "Rocky", Jackie Chan, The Terminator called "Hercules" in Japan and "Master Attacker" in the West, Spider-Man, Batman, and Godzilla called "Monster-G" are present. Both Spider-Man and Batman are actually fake representations of the characters conducted by a shapeshifter named "Metamorpher" who alters his appearance after sustaining a certain amount of damage. Additionally, Joe Musashi's face on the title sequence resembled that of actor Sonny Chiba dressed as his character Hattori Hanzō from the Japanese TV series Shadow Warriors (Kage no Gundan).
 Software revision 1.01 (1989): The fake Spider-Man is now redesigned into the licensed character from Marvel Comics. Since he is now the real Spider-Man, he does not morph into Batman. Instead, Spider-Man leaves the battle when enough damage is inflicted and Batman is replaced by a winged Devilman-like creature. Monster-G remains unmodified.  The "Gunner" enemy soldiers with flamethrowers are also changed to bald men with headbands, altering their original likeness to Rambo (although Sega had the license to the character for their Rambo III console games, they did not use it for this game).
 Software revision 1.02 (1990): A new copyright screen is made to acknowledge the license to Spider-Man (Sega already had the license to the character for their game The Amazing Spider-Man vs. The Kingpin) and the music composition by Yuzo Koshiro. Monster-G still remains intact.
 Software revision 1.03 (1990): Monster-G is redesigned into a skeletal dinosaur. Everything else remains intact from the previous revision, including the licensed use of Spider-Man. This version was used in the Genesis 6-Pak cartridge along with the "Sega Classics" edition of the game.
 Software revision 1.04 (2009/2012): Since the licensed use of the boss Spider-Man was for a limited period of time, the game was subsequently prevented from being re-released years later. The 2009 release for the Virtual Console as well as the Xbox Live Arcade and PlayStation Network 2012 releases feature a new software revision (1.04) that omits the Marvel copyright notice and replaces Spider-Man with a pink palette swap of the character that still behaves the same as the licensed Spider-Man. Joe Musashi's design in the title screen was also altered to remove his likeness to Sonny Chiba.

The credit roll, shown when achieving a "good" ending, was removed from the non-Japanese versions of the game. In versions 1.00 and 1.01, "©SEGA 1989 / MUSIC ©1989 YUZO KOSHIRO" would be shown at the bottom of the title screen like normal; when the Spider-Man copyright notice was added to the game, all copyright bylines were moved to a screen displayed before the intro.

Sega Smash Pack
The version included in volume 1 of the PC Smash Pack collection appears to be a prototype version. The internal ROM date says March 1989, and the product number is filled with zeroes. In the notes section of the ROM header (at 0x1C8), there is the string, "A0115 Sega_Channel", whereas all other releases have that area filled with ASCII space characters. The header is also only marked as being a Japanese release, while all other versions are marked as Japanese, US, and European.

The title screen always uses The Super Shinobi regardless of the console region. The game has an invincibility mode in the options screen, and a level select at the main menu. Enabling invincibility also gives infinite lives from falling offscreen, going out open doors, and using Mijin (it also prevents the player from gaining lives). There are other changes found in the options menu: the shuriken option is spelled "syurikin" (in other versions, it is spelled "shurikin"), and the sound test option lacks music titles, showing only a hex number (in other versions, sound effects are numbered in decimal).

There is no copyright screen.  The introduction uses the final version Round 1 music (The Shinobi) instead of its own theme. The sound effect when Musashi changes his grip does not play, and the sparks when shuriken hit the sword stay on screen longer. There are no demos other than the opening animation (i.e. no plot text or gameplay demos).

Using Mijin uses up ninjutsu; in other versions, ninjutsu is still available after using Mijin. Mijin also remains selected after it has been used, instead of switching to Ikazuchi. There is also no shouting sound effect when ninjutsu are activated.

The final game has nineteen music tracks, but this version only has the first seven (the order of music in the sound test is unchanged). Because of this, there are differences in what music is used for what round, but even when the music is in all versions, different tracks are used. The music used in 1-1 is China Beat, and 1-2's music is "Make Me Dance" while, in the final version, both stages use The Shinobi. The game over screen has no music and is missing the Masked Ninja's laughter. The drum samples used throughout the game are also different.

For the most part, the enemies resemble the REV00 versions including the two-phase fight with Metamorpher, appearing as an imposter Spider-Man and Batman.

Some bosses appear incomplete. Monster-G, the boss of Round 7, seems to be invincible, and the fight ends after the boss goes through a few attacks. The Round 3 and 8 bosses appear to be missing completely (although the maps themselves are there); the game switches to the end of the level screen shortly after starting. There is no ending either: the game loops back to Round 1 after 8–3.

Reception

The Revenge of Shinobi received positive reviews from critics. The game received 5 out of 5 stars in Dragon; they called it a masterpiece for its animation, graphics, sound and gameplay, but the final boss battle was criticised for being too difficult. Zero magazine said The Super Shinobi is "brilliant" with graphics, sounds and playability "leaps and bounds ahead of anything on console or computer" while surpassing the playability of the original arcade Shinobi. MegaTech magazine praised the "smart gameplay, graphics and sound".  Reviewing the game's appearance in Sega Arcade Classics, Glenn Rubenstein said it "was one of the first Genesis games released, and it shows how far Sega has come since then".

Accolades

In 1997, Electronic Gaming Monthly ranked Revenge of Shinobi the 83rd best console video game of all time, saying it "packs fantastic level design and even better gameplay". They also praised the novelty of battling obvious clones of Spider-Man, Batman, the Terminator, and Godzilla. In 2004, The Revenge of Shinobi was inducted into GameSpot's list of the greatest games of all time. Mega placed the game at #18 in their Top Mega Drive Games of All Time. In 2017, Gamesradar listed the game 39th on its "Best Sega Genesis/Mega Drive games of all time."

Sequel
A sequel to The Revenge of Shinobi, titled Shinobi III: Return of the Ninja Master, was released in 1993.

Legacy
A suite of music from the game was performed live by an orchestra at the Fourth Symphonic Game Music Concert in 2006 at the Gewandhaus zu Leipzig, Germany. The arrangement was done by original composer Yuzo Koshiro. Music from The Revenge of Shinobi was also performed at two concerts of PLAY! A Video Game Symphony in Stockholm, Sweden in 2007. It was also played during the encore as the most voted song when PLAY! A Video Game Symphony was performing in Singapore (June 2007). Sound effects from the game were also used in the Heavy Shinobi fight in Sonic Mania.

Notes

References

External links 
  

1989 video games
Arcade video games
Overworks games
Platform games
PlayStation Network games
Sega video games
Sega CD games
Sega Genesis games
Shinobi (series)
Single-player video games
Video game sequels
Video games scored by Yuzo Koshiro
Video games set in Detroit
Video games set in New York City
Video games set in Tokyo
Virtual Console games
Xbox 360 Live Arcade games
Video games developed in Japan